Sir William Arthur Mount, 1st Baronet CBE DL (Hartley, Hampshire, 3 August 1866 – 8 December 1930) was a British Conservative Party politician and Member of Parliament for the Newbury constituency. He is the great-grandfather of Conservative politician David Cameron, who was Prime Minister of the United Kingdom from 2010 to 2016.

Early life
The eldest son of William George Mount of Wasing Place, Berkshire and wife Marianne Emily Clutterbuck, he was educated at Eton College and New College, Oxford where he achieved honours in classics and modern history.

Career

Law and politics
He was called to the Bar by the Inner Temple in 1893. Between 1896 and 1903 he served as assistant private secretary to two Chancellors of Exchequer, Sir Michael Hicks Beach (later Viscount St. Aldwyn) and (from October 1902) Charles Thomson Ritchie (later Lord Ritchie of Dundee).

After his father stepped down as member for the South, or Newbury division of Berkshire in 1900 he was elected and served for six years before being defeated at the 1906 general election by his Liberal opponent. In the January 1910 general election he stood again and succeeded in regaining his seat where he remained until resigning in 1922.

Berkshire appointments
He was a deputy lieutenant and magistrate for Berkshire and was elected chairman of the Berkshire county council in 1926.

Baronetcy
He was created a baronet in the 1921 Birthday Honours.

Marriage and family
Mount married Hilda Lucy Adelaide Low on 9 November 1899 in Kensington, London, Middlesex. Hilda was born 23 May 1875 to William Malcolm Low and wife (m. 30 July 1872), Lady Ida Matilda Alice Feilding. She died 3 April 1950.

Mount and his wife were parents to Sir William Mount, 2nd Baronet, Robert Francis Mount  and George Richard Mount.

Death
He died while crossing a meadow at Aldermaston while riding with the South Berkshire hounds from his residence at Wasing Place on 8 December 1930.

Notes

References

External links 
 

1866 births
1930 deaths
People educated at Eton College
Alumni of New College, Oxford
Members of Berkshire County Council
Conservative Party (UK) MPs for English constituencies
Baronets in the Baronetage of the United Kingdom
Commanders of the Order of the British Empire
Deputy Lieutenants of Berkshire
Newbury, Berkshire
People from Wasing
UK MPs 1900–1906
UK MPs 1910
UK MPs 1910–1918
UK MPs 1918–1922
William
Church Estates Commissioners
English barristers